Pepato is a semi-hard sheep milk cheese with peppercorns. Pepato (or Pecorino pepato; Tumazzu di piecura ccu pepi, Sicilano) has its main origin in Sicily where it is part of the regional cooking. Usually is used as 2–4 months aged cheese, but a mild younger version (10 days) can easily be found in Italian stores. Peppercorns are added during the subtraction of the whey.

See also
 List of Italian cheeses

References

Cuisine of Sicily
Sheep's-milk cheeses
Italian cheeses